Glenamaddy GAA is a Gaelic Athletic Association club based in Glenamaddy, County Galway, Ireland. The club is a member of the Galway GAA. Glenamaddy compete in the Galway Intermediate Football Championship yet they have not won the competition in their history.

Notable players
Shay Walsh 
Fergal O’ Neill
Enda Geraghty 
Pat Connolly

References

Gaelic football clubs in County Galway
Gaelic games clubs in County Galway